Pseudomonas avellanae is a Gram-negative plant pathogenic bacterium. It is the causal agent of bacterial canker of hazelnut (Corylus avellana). Based on 16S rRNA analysis, P. avellanae has been placed in the P. syringae group. This species was once included as a pathovar of Pseudomonas syringae, but following DNA-DNA hybridization, it was instated as a separate species. Following ribotypical analysis Pseudomonas syringae pv. theae was incorporated into this species.

References

External links
 Type strain of Pseudomonas avellanae at BacDive -  the Bacterial Diversity Metadatabase

Pseudomonadales
Bacterial tree pathogens and diseases
Bacteria described in 1996